Shahijani (also Romanized as Shāhījānī and Shāhī Jānī; Shāhījān and Shāyejānī) is a village in Poshtkuh Rural District, Bushkan District, Dashtestan County, Bushehr Province, Iran. At the 2006 census, its population was 151, in 37 families.

References 

Populated places in Dashtestan County